Ozar  is a census town in Nashik District in the Indian state of Maharashtra. It is part of Nashik Metropolitan Region.

Demographics
 India census, Ozar (Ojhar, Ozhar) has a population of 51,297. Males constitute 52% of the population and females 48%. Ozar has an average literacy rate of 78.9%, higher than the national average of 74.04%: male literacy is 82%, and female literacy is 75%. In Ozar, 12.35% of the population is under 6 years of age. Ozar has some major central government installations; HAL and an Indian Air Force & Military Engineering Services (MES) Station. The town is famous for its Vineyards, Grapes, and Onions.

The town, also called Ozar Mig has defence-based Airport also known as Nashik Airport or Ozar Airport and daily cargo services are from here. An alternate option to reduce air traffic of Major nearby cities. The Pragati Aerospace Museum is also located here.

The town is situated on the Indian national Highway no. 3, which is the Mumbai Agra National highway. It is one of the fast developing and growing towns in Nashik district.

Common 
In early 1925, the table grape revolution was started in Ozar by Shri Raosaheb Jairam Krishna Gaikwad.

References

http://www.censusindia.gov.in/pca/SearchDetails.aspx?Id=620793

Cities and towns in Nashik district